Palmer Brook Bridge is a historic stone faced, concrete arch bridge over the Ausable River at AuSable Forks in Clinton County, New York.  It was built in 1938 with assistance from the Works Progress Administration.  The bridge is 25 feet (7.6 m) in length, 15 feet (4.6 m) wide, and six feet (1.8 m) in height.

It was listed on the National Register of Historic Places in 1999.  The bridge was replaced in 2003 with a modern bridge that appears stylistically similar.

References

Road bridges on the National Register of Historic Places in New York (state)
Bridges completed in 1938
Bridges in Clinton County, New York
National Register of Historic Places in Clinton County, New York
Arch bridges in the United States
Concrete bridges in the United States